Zuver is an unincorporated community in Placer County, California. It lies at an elevation of 3921 feet (1195 m).

The Zuver mine is nearby.

References

Unincorporated communities in California
Unincorporated communities in Placer County, California